A keyswitch is a type of small switch used for keys on keyboards.
Key switch is also used to describe a switch operated by a key, usually used in burglar alarm circuits. A car ignition is also a switch of this type.

Computer keyboards